Cilycwm is a village and parish located in Carmarthenshire, Wales. The community population taken at the 2011 census was 487.

Cilycwm lies on the west bank of Afon Gwenlais, a tributary of the Tywi, north of the town of Llandovery. Pont Dolauhirion, a bridge that crosses the Tywi at the south of the community was designed by William Edwards and is a copy of his famous bridge at Pontypridd. The bridge is a grade I listed structure 

The parish church of St Michael's is also a grade I listed building.

Governance
An electoral ward in the same name exists. This ward stretches south to Llansadwrn. The total population of this ward taken at the 2011 census was 1518.

The community is bordered by the communities of: Llanfair-ar-y-bryn; Llandovery; Llanwrda; and Cynwyl Gaeo, all being in Carmarthenshire; and by Llanddewi Brefi in Ceredigion.

Notable people 
 Morgan Rhys (1716–1779), a Welsh hymn-writer.

References

External links 

Cil-y-cwm, GENUKI- Information on the history of the parish
Cilycwm Community Association website

Villages in Carmarthenshire
Communities in Carmarthenshire